Dubbak can refer to any of the following places in Telangana, India:

 Dubbak, Medak, a village in Medak district
 Dubbak (Assembly constituency), a constituency of the Telangana Legislative Assembly in Medak district
 Dubbak, Nalgonda, a village in Nalgonda district
 Dubbak, Nizamabad, a village in Nizamabad district

See also 
 Dubbaka